George T. Chaponda  (born 1 November 1942) is a Malawian career diplomat and politician who served as Malawi's Minister of Agriculture, Irrigation and Water Development from 2016 to 2017. He is a founding member of the ruling Democratic Progressive Party (DPP) and is a DPP Member of Parliament from Mulanje district in southern Malawi.

Early life
Born in Chonde Village, Mulanje District, Chaponda studied at the University of Delhi from 1963 to 1968 where he received degrees in history and political science. He was admitted to the bar in 1980.

Career
He  has held a number of senior positions in Zambia, including chief executive of a parastal organisation.  From 1984 to 2002, he worked  mostly as a senior lawyer for the  Office for the United Nations High Commissioner for Refugees  in Somalia, Kenya, Thailand, Bangladesh, Switzerland, Austria, Poland and Ethiopia. From 2003-2004 he was Chairman of the University Council of the University of Malawi.  In 2004 Chaponda entered Malawian politics and was elected  as a Member of Parliament for  the Mulanje South West constituency. In June 2004, he was appointed Minister of Foreign Affairs in the cabinet of the newly elected President Bingu wa Mutharika. He served in that position until 2005, when he was appointed Minister of Local Government and Rural Development. After the elections in May 2009, President Peter Mutharika appointed him Minister of Education, but moved him to lead the Ministry of Justice and Constitutional Affairs in 2010. The entire cabinet was dismissed on 19 August 2011.

In September 2011, President Peter Mutharika re-appointed him to cabinet as Minister of Education, Science and Technology. He served in that post until April 2012, when the president died suddenly of a heart attack. Mutharika's successor, Joyce Banda, appointed Chaponda Minister of Foreign Affairs and International Cooperation on 22 June 2014. On 7 April 2016, President Peter Mutharika moved Chaponda to the Ministry of Agriculture, Irrigation and Water Development. 

Mutharika then appointed him Leader of the House of Assembly in May 2016.  After a brief suspension in early 2017, Chaponda was re-instated in February but only held the post for a week before he was succeeded by his deputy Kondwani Nankhumwa in an interim capacity, pending the results of Chaponda's ongoing corruption investigation.

He is rumoured to have been groomed to succeed President Peter Mutharika, who could leave office as early as 2019 after the expected tripartite elections.

Air Fouling Legislation
In February 2011, Chaponda said that a clause in the Local Courts bill making it a misdemeanor to "vitiate the atmosphere" would criminalize flatulence to "promote decency".
He told the private Capital Radio's popular Straight Talk programme, "Would you be happy to see people farting anyhow?" The story was quickly picked up by the foreign press. The Solicitor General Anthony Kamanga contradicted him, saying the bill referred only to air pollution. Later, Chaponda retracted his remarks, saying he had not read the proposed bill before commenting.

Personal life
Chaponda is a Christian, is married and has children. During a parliamentary debate in the Malawi parliament in 2016, he was involved in an altercation with a Member of Parliament from the opposition People's Party (PP), Harry Mlekanjala Mkandawire. Mkandawire is said to have said Chaponda is one of seven ministers alleged to be in an audit report for the plunder of government funds in Malawi, popularly known as Cashgate.

His son, comedian Daliso Chaponda, appeared on Britain's Got Talent in 2017, claiming Amanda Holden's Golden Buzzer. He ended up finishing in third place.

References

1942 births
Living people
Delhi University alumni
University of Zambia alumni
Yale Law School alumni
Foreign Ministers of Malawi
Malawian diplomats
Malawian Christians
People from Mulanje District
Academic staff of the University of Malawi
Government ministers of Malawi
Members of the National Assembly (Malawi)